Tomas Tenconi (born 3 September 1980)  is a former professional Italian tennis player.

ATP tournaments finals

Titles (3)

References

External links
 
 

Italian male tennis players
1980 births
Living people
21st-century Italian people